Robert Francis Waldron (January 4, 1903 – November 25, 1952) was an American politician in the state of Washington. He served in the Washington House of Representatives from 1933 to 1939 and 1945 to 1947. He was Speaker of the House from 1935 to 1937.

References

1952 deaths
1903 births
Democratic Party members of the Washington House of Representatives
20th-century American politicians